The black-lined plated lizard (Gerrhosaurus nigrolineatus) is a species of lizard in the Gerrhosauridae family.
It is found in Gabon, Democratic Republic of the Congo, Angola, Namibia, Tanzania, Botswana, Malawi, Mozambique, South Africa,
Zimbabwe, Kenya, and Zambia.

References

Gerrhosaurus
Reptiles described in 1857
Taxa named by Edward Hallowell (herpetologist)